Luis Emilio de Souza Ferreira Huby (born October 6, 1908 in Lima – died September 29, 2008 in La Punta) was a football forward player from Peru who played for Universitario de Deportes.

Club career 
Souza studied engineering and made his professional debut with Universitario de Deportes in 1926. He remained with the club during his 8 years as a professional footballer.

International career 
He played for the Peru National Team from 1929 to 1934. In 1930 he represented his country in the 1930 FIFA World Cup finals in Uruguay. In this competition he scored the first ever Peruvian World Cup goal.

International goals 
Peru's goal tally first

Personal life

Death 
Don Lucho died September 2008, only a few days short of his 100th birthday.

See also 
One-club man

References

External links 

1908 births
2008 deaths
Footballers from Lima
Peruvian footballers
Peru international footballers
Club Universitario de Deportes footballers
Peruvian Primera División players
Association football forwards
1930 FIFA World Cup players
Peruvian people of Portuguese descent